Public swimming pools in Hong Kong are managed by the Leisure and Cultural Services Department (LCSD). There are 44 public swimming pools in Hong Kong; 9 in Hong Kong Island, 13 in Kowloon, and 22 in the New Territories. LCSD manages public swimming pools according to Law of Hong Kong Chapter 132 sections 42 to 45.

History

20th century
Victoria Park Swimming Pool, built and managed by the Urban Council and funded by the Hong Kong Jockey Club, was the first public swimming complex in Hong Kong. The 50 by 20 metre pool was officially unveiled on 16 October 1957 by former Governor Sir Alexander Grantham. It was highly popular with residents, and served over 360,000 over its first year of operation. The spectator stand seated 1,700. This facility operated continuously until 2013, when it was closed and replaced by a new indoor swimming pool (of the same name) on the site adjacent. The old pool will consequently be demolished, sparking some mourning of the loss of a piece of the collective memory of many Hong Kong residents. In response, the LCSD stated they would "explore the possibility" of displaying some items of historical significance, such as the plaque unveiled by Governor Grantham, at the new facility, and planned to make use of "3D laser scanning technology" to record the architecture of the old pool complex.

Kowloon Tsai Swimming Pool, in Kowloon Tsai Park, opened in 1964 as the first public swimming pool in Kowloon. The opening of the facility was publicised internationally in a British Pathé newsreel, which stated a construction cost of £125,000 and highlighted the lack of bathing beaches in the densely populated vicinity.

The first indoor heated public pool, Morrison Hill Swimming Pool in Wan Chai, opened in 1972. While many swimming facilities close in the winter season, the public now has the option of visiting 24 different public heated pools, both indoor and outdoor, which remain open during the colder months.

Many swimming complexes of the 1960s and 1970s were funded, in part or whole, by the Royal Hong Kong Jockey Club. One of these was the Tsuen Wan Swimming Pool, opened 1975, which was the first public swimming pool in the New Territories. The name was changed to Kwai Shing Swimming Pool in 1978. The standardised design of the complex is typical of the era, incorporating two 50-metre pools, changing rooms and lobby located mostly underneath a covered grandstand, and several other smaller teaching pools.

The Pao Yue-Kong Swimming Pool complex, the only public pool in Southern District, was officially opened on 9 July 1977 by then-Governor Sir Murray MacLehose. It is named after Yue-Kong Pao, who donated funds toward its establishment.

The Sha Tin Jockey Club Swimming Pool, the largest pool complex in Sha Tin District, opened in April 1981. The Royal Hong Kong Jockey Club funded the $33 million project in its entirety as to commemorate the opening of the nearby Sha Tin Racecourse.

In the 1980s, the Urban Council announced a policy of building more "fun pools" with special free-form designs and water toys. A councilor explained, "It is felt that these fun pools will provide more fun, excitement and enjoyment for the public who no longer regard swimming as a mere form of exercise." In 1985, four such pools were planned for Kowloon and a fifth for Hong Kong Island.

The Regional Council (RegCo) was founded in 1986. Prior to that date, swimming pools in the New Territories fell under the purview of the Director of Urban Services, as the Urban Services Department, the executive arm of the Urban Council, had been servicing the New Territories since its establishment in 1953. The operation of New Territories swimming pools was subsequently transferred to RegCo, who also built new facilities.

Kowloon Park Swimming Pool, opened on 12 September 1989, has undergone several upgrades in recent years. It served as the venue for the aquatics events in the 2009 East Asian Games, and is today has the highest patronage of all pool complexes in Hong Kong, serving over 2000 swimmers per day.

21st century
With the dissolution of the Urban Council and Regional Council at the end of the millennium, operations of all public swimming pools were taken up by the newly formed Leisure and Cultural Services Department (LCSD).

Controversy erupted in 2004 after thousands of bloodworms were found in various public swimming pools. The worms reportedly posed no threat to humans, but LCSD management came under fire for not being forthcoming about the issue. A "massive cleanup" was undertaken to eliminate the worms.

2004 lifeguard staffing cuts 
In 2004 the LCSD slashed the lifeguard workforce from around 2,400 to 1,580. The Hong Kong and Kowloon Life Guards’ Union has spoken out against this cut in the years since, stating that it is unsafe and puts unreasonable pressure on the lifeguards. Many swimming pools have protest signage about this issue, which the LCSD has asked the lifeguards to remove. The lifeguards have gone on strike in 2004, 2005, and 2014.

2014 lifeguard strike 
In August 2014, at the height of the summer swimming season, many lifeguards serving Hong Kong's beaches and swimming pools went on strike. About 400 lifeguards staged a sit-in at the headquarters of the Leisure and Cultural Services Department in Sha Tin.

Lifesaving staff complained that since lifeguard numbers were cut drastically in 2004 their workload has been too great, with lifeguards having to look after greater numbers of swimmers, and warned that safety had been compromised by the government cutbacks. They said the situation has been exacerbated by crowding caused by increasing numbers of mainland tourists at Hong Kong pools and beaches. The vice chairman of the Hong Kong and Kowloon Lifeguards' Union complained, "some of them urinate everywhere and jump into the pool without wearing swim suits, or bring food to the venue. They don't have the same personal hygiene and safety standards." 

It was suggested that the influx of mainland swimmers was a result of poor water quality in mainland Chinese swimming pools. A Shenzhen newspaper, Southern Metropolis Daily, had also published an article highlighting the affordability and good facilities of Hong Kong's pools compared to those in Shenzhen. After the report was published, the number of LCSD pool closures due to contamination of the pool water with vomit or feces reached the highest level in six years. As a result of the staff shortage during the strike, some pools were temporarily closed and certain facilities at others, like toddler pools, shut down to divert staff resources.

New pools
In recent years the LCSD has replaced several older facilities. The new HK$800 million facility at Victoria Park hosts a 50 by 25 metre main pool, a multi-purpose pool with adjustable depth floor and diving platform, and the largest swimming pool spectator stand in Hong Kong, seating 2,500. On 11 May 2011, the first phase of the new Kennedy Town Swimming Pool opened, relocated in order to facilitate West Island line construction works. On 1 April 2013, the new Kwun Tong Swimming Pool opened on a site directly adjacent to the old pool complex.

Several new pools are planned. A new Wan Chai Swimming Pool recently opened to replace an older pool of the same name, which will be demolished to make way for the new Exhibition Centre station of the Sha Tin to Central Link. Another new pool is planned for Tin Shui Wai North, as the two existing pools in the new town are very crowded.

Monthly ticket scheme

The Public Swimming Pool Monthly Ticket Scheme began on 5 July 2012 (ticket selling started on 21 June). The Leisure and Cultural Services Department is responsible for this scheme.

The then Chief executive Sir Donald Tsang Yam-kuen announced in the 2011-2012 Policy Address the introduction of "monthly tickets for public swimming pools to encourage members of the public to swim regularly. Concessionary rates will be available for the elderly, people with disabilities, students and children."

Prices are:
HKD$300 for monthly ticket (half price for students, children from 3 to 13 years old, persons aged 60 and above). 
HKD$19 for single entrance admission, HKD$9 concessionary rate.

All public swimming pools in Hong Kong are available except Wan Chai Swimming Pool.

List of pools

Hong Kong Island

Kowloon

New Territories

Proposed pools

References

External links

 Leisure and Cultural Services Department – Beaches and Swimming Pools
 Leisure and Cultural Services Department – Public Swimming Pool Monthly Ticket Scheme
 Designated Booking Offices of Swimming Pool Monthly Tickets

Lists of buildings and structures in Hong Kong